Islambek Dadov is an Azerbaijani Greco-Roman wrestler.

He won the gold medal in the boys' 69 kg event at the 2014 Summer Youth Olympics held in Nanjing, China.

In 2020, he won the silver medal in the 67 kg event at the Individual Wrestling World Cup held in Belgrade, Serbia. In March 2021, he competed at the European Qualification Tournament in Budapest, Hungary hoping to qualify for the 2020 Summer Olympics in Tokyo, Japan. He was eliminated in his third match by Slavik Galstyan of Armenia.

References

External links 
 

Living people
Year of birth missing (living people)
Place of birth missing (living people)
Azerbaijani male sport wrestlers
Wrestlers at the 2014 Summer Youth Olympics
Youth Olympic gold medalists for Azerbaijan
21st-century Azerbaijani people